Guillaume Boulle de Larigaudie (Paris, January 18, 1908 – May 11, 1940 Musson, Belgium), known as Guy de Larigaudie and the "legendary Rover", was a French writer of Scout novels and travel books, Rover Scout of France, writer, explorer, lecturer and journalist.

His life was a vivid testimony, that living with God is perfectly possible and desired also in the modern times. His "Theo-centric" axis, as he calls the fundamental direction of his life, guided him safely through all his adventures in the sky, on the sea or in the arms of the most beautiful exotic women he met on his travels. He kept the chastity and clean innocent view just like a curious child, always relating the surrounding world as gifts from God.

His notes and thoughts from his adventures can be found mainly in the 1943 book Étoile au grand large.

Publications

Books for young people
 Yug, éditions Jean de Gigord, collection "Le feu de camp", 1934 (reissued by Éditions Delahaye, 2004 )
 Raa la buse, éditions Jean de Gigord, collection "Le feu de camp", 1935
 L'Îlot du grand étang, éditions Jean de Gigord, collection "Le feu de camp", 1936
 Le Tigre et sa panthère, Alsatia, collection "Signe de piste", 1937
 Yug en terres inconnues, éditions Jean de Gigord, collection "Le feu de camp", 1938
 La Frégate aventurière, Alsatia, collection "Signe de piste", 1938
 Harka le barzoï, éditions Jean de Gigord, collection "Le feu de camp", 1939
 La Légende du ski, illustrations by Samivel, Éditions Delagrave, 1940

Travel books
 Vingt scouts autour du monde, Desclée de Brouwer, 1935
 Par trois routes américaines, Desclée de Brouwer, 1937
 Résonances du Sud (account of his travels in Polynesia), Plon, Paris, 1938
 La Route aux aventures (account of his journey by car from Paris to Saïgon), Plon, Paris, 1939

Posthumous publications
 Étoile au grand large, suivi du Chant du vieux pays (spiritual testament), Seuil, Paris, 1943
 Le Beau Jeu de ma vie (collected correspondence), Seuil, Paris, 1948

Biographies
 Jean Peyrade, Routiers de France, Le Puy en Velais, Xavier Mappus, 1944
 Jean Vaulon, Guy de Larigaudie, routier de légende, Lyon, La Hutte, collection "Amitié des héros", 1944
 Pierre Croidys, Guy de Larigaudie, Paris, Plon, 1947
 Jean Peyrade, Guy de Larigaudie ou l'aventure intérieure, Bruxelles, Casterman, 1948 (plus several subsequent editions and translations)
 Louis-Bernard Koch, Guy Lehideux and Charlie Kiéfer, Avec Guy de Larigaudie, sur les chemins de l'aventure, Éditions du Triomphe, 2000
 Guy Demange, Au pays de Guy de Larigaudie, 2016, Bellegarde, 32 pp.
 Association des Écrivains combattants, Georges Cerbelaud-Salagnac, Anthologie de écrivains morts à la guerre (1939-1945), Paris, Éditions Albin Michel, pp. 424-433 (reissued 2017)

External links
Deutsche Biographie
BNF Catalogue

Sud Ouest: Florence Desmaison, Sur les traces de Guy de Larigaudie, 31 January 2015
Famille Chrétienne: Élisabeth Caillemer, Guy de Larigaudie: explorateur de l'âme humaine, 11 May 2020
Aleteia: Les cinq leçons de vie d'un scout de légende, 23 July 2018

Scouting and Guiding in France
1908 births
1940 deaths
French military personnel killed in World War II